Carlos Alcaraz defeated Casper Ruud in the final, 7–5, 6–4 to win the men's singles tennis title at the 2022 Miami Open. It was his first Masters 1000 title, and he became the first Spaniard to win the title. The victory also made Alcaraz, at 18 years and 333 days old, the youngest men's singles titlist in Miami Open history, and the youngest Masters 1000 champion since Rafael Nadal at the 2005 Monte Carlo Masters. Ruud became the first Norwegian to reach a Masters 1000 final, and the first Scandinavian since Robin Söderling at the 2010 Paris Masters.

Hubert Hurkacz was the defending champion, but lost in the semifinals to Alcaraz.

By reaching the semifinals on his Masters 1000 debut, Francisco Cerúndolo became the first player to achieve the feat since Jerzy Janowicz at the 2012 Paris Masters. Ranked No. 103, Cerúndolo was also the lowest-ranked semifinalist in tournament history.

Novak Djokovic and Daniil Medvedev were in contention for the ATP No. 1 singles ranking. Djokovic retained the top ranking when Medvedev lost in the quarterfinals to Hurkacz.

This tournament marked the final professional appearance of former world No. 5 and two-time major finalist Kevin Anderson, who lost in the second round to Juan Manuel Cerúndolo.

Seeds
All seeds received a bye into the second round.

Draw

Finals

Top half

Section 1

Section 2

Section 3

Section 4

Bottom half

Section 5

Section 6

Section 7

Section 8

Seeded players
The following are the seeded players. Seedings are based on ATP rankings as of March 21, 2022. Rankings and points before are as of March 21, 2022.

As a result of special ranking adjustment rules due to the COVID-19 pandemic, players are defending the higher of (i) their points from the 2021 tournament or (ii) the remaining 50% of their points from the 2019 tournament. Those points were not mandatory and are included in the table below only if they counted towards the player's ranking as of March 21, 2022. Players who are not defending points from the 2021 or 2019 tournaments will instead have their 19th best result replaced by their points from the 2022 tournament.

† This column shows either (a) the higher of (1) the player's points from the 2021 tournament or (2) 50% of his points from the 2019 tournament, or (b) his 19th best result (shown in brackets). Only ranking points counting towards the player's ranking as of March 21, 2022, are reflected in the column.
‡ The player is also defending points from a 2019 ATP Challenger Tour tournament (Monterrey)

Withdrawn players
The following players would have been seeded, but withdrew before the tournament began.

Other entry information

Wildcards

Source:

Protected ranking

Qualifiers

Lucky loser

Withdrawals

Qualifying

Seeds

Qualifiers

Lucky loser

Qualifying draw

First qualifier

Second qualifier

Third qualifier

Fourth qualifier

Fifth qualifier

Sixth qualifier

Seventh qualifier

Eighth qualifier

Ninth qualifier

Tenth qualifier

Eleventh qualifier

Twelfth qualifier

References

External links
 Main draw
 Qualifying draw

Miami Open – Men's singles
Singles men
Men in Florida